The Hill is an American newspaper and digital media company based in Washington, D.C. that was founded in 1994.

Focusing on politics, policy, business and international relations, The Hills coverage includes the U.S. Congress, the presidency and executive branch, and election campaigns. The Hill describes its output as "nonpartisan reporting on the inner workings of Government and the nexus of politics and business".

The company's primary outlet is TheHill.com. The Hill is additionally distributed in print for free around Washington, D.C. and distributed to all congressional offices. It is owned by Nexstar Media Group since 2021.

History

Founding and early years
The company was founded as a newspaper in 1994 by Democratic power broker and New York businessman Jerry Finkelstein, and Martin Tolchin, a former correspondent for The New York Times. New York Representative Gary L. Ackerman was also a major shareholder. The name of the publication alludes to "Capitol Hill" as a synecdoche for the United States Congress and government generally.

In 2012, James "Jimmy" A. Finkelstein assumed control of the organization.

Digital distribution and print circulation
The Hill has grown to become the second most-viewed US political news website and the third-most tweeted U.S. news source.

In 2016, The New York Times reported that The Hill was "proceeding with ambitious expansion plans" to become a national brand publication, and its website traffic increased 126% over the prior year, and was above Politico's traffic for the period.

Following the 2016 US presidential election, The Street reported that The Hill saw the largest increase in online political readership among political news sites, with an increase of 780%. CNN and Politico saw smaller increases over the period, making The Hill "the fastest-growing political news site". In 2017, The Hill was also cited by Twitter as one of the top 10 "most-tweeted" news sources. A 2017 study by the Berkman Klein Center for Internet & Society at Harvard University found that The Hill was the second most-shared source among supporters of Donald Trump on Twitter during the election, behind Breitbart News.

In 2019, The Hill was ranked second among all US news sites for political readership, second to CNN, and ahead of Capitol Hill competitors such as Politico. 

In 2020, it was again ranked second for online politics readership across all news sites, behind only CNN. It remained ahead of Politico, Fox News, NBCNews.com and MSNBC TV.

As of 2020, the newspaper claims to have more than 22,000 print readers. The Hill is distributed for free in newspaper boxes around the U.S. Capitol building, and mailed directly to all congressional offices.

As of 2020, The Hills YouTube channel had 1,100,000 subscribers, ahead of Politico, Axios, and Bloomberg Politics. In October 2020, The Hills YouTube channel averaged over 1.5 million daily video views and more than 10 million per week; in September 2020 it received over 340 million video views.

In 2021, The Hill was acquired by Nexstar Media Group for $130 million.

Features and editions

The Hill TV
In June 2018, The Hill launched Hill.TV, a digital news channel. Four years later, the channel expanded to a 24/7 FAST streaming service and was rebranded as The Hill TV. It's distributed by Haystack, LG, LocalNow, Plex, Roku, and Vizio. Programming includes Rising, a morning news program first hosted by Krystal Ball and Buck Sexton. In May 2021, Ball and Saagar Enjeti announced they were departing in order to release their own independent project, Breaking Points with Krystal and Saagar. Since then, Robby Soave, Ryan Grim, Kim Iversen, Emily Jashinsky, Batya Ungar-Sargon, and  Briahna Joy Gray have hosted the program, along with guests including Colin Rogero, Jamal Simmons, Emily Miller, Alyssa Farah, and Rachel Bovard.

Notable stories and awards
The National Press Club's annual Sandy Hume Memorial Award is named after staffer Sandy Hume, in recognition of his 1997 reporting in The Hill of an attempted Republican coup against then-speaker Newt Gingrich.

Staffing

Masthead
Joe Ruffolo, General Manager
Bob Cusack, Editor-in-Chief

Past

James Carville
Ron Christie
Judd Gregg
David Keene
Josh Marshall
Dick Morris
A. B. Stoddard
Byron York
John Solomon
Gen. Michael Hayden (ret.) (former NSA and CIA director)

Controversies
In 2017, The Hill hired John Solomon. Solomon inserted material from advertisers into journalistic copy, leading to protests from The Hills publisher. Solomon's role was changed to opinion contributor. In March 2018, he conspired to publish a report about the challenged Biden–Ukraine conspiracy theory. In September 2019, Solomon left The Hill.

In January 2019, CNN claimed Finkelstein interfered in the editorial independence of the paper by "keeping a watchful eye on the newspaper’s coverage to ensure it is not too critical" of U.S. President Donald Trump.

Kim Iversen was a host on Rising. She was a critic of Anthony Fauci. According to the Daily Beast, Iversen left the show in July 2022 after being excluded from participating in an interview with Fauci. Katie Halper, a former free-lancer with Rising, was terminated on September 28, 2022. The Intercept reported that she recorded a "Radar" monologue that described Israel as an "apartheid" state.

References

External links

1995 establishments in Washington, D.C.
2021 mergers and acquisitions
American political websites
Legislative branch of the United States government
Newspapers published in Washington, D.C.
Political mass media in the United States
Publications established in 1995
01
Weekly newspapers published in the United States